= Sohbat Gola =

- Location within Pakistan
- Coordinates: 28.17°N 69.02°E
- Country: Pakistan
- Province: Sindh
- Elevation: 71 m (233 ft)
- Time zone: UTC+5 (PST)

Sohbat Gola is a village in Sindh province of Pakistan. It is located at 28°17'0N 69°2'10E with an altitude of 71 metres (236 feet).
